The Curré Formation is a geologic formation of the Taraba Basin Group in Costa Rica. The deltaic conglomerates preserve fossils dating back to the Late Miocene to Early Pliocene period (Hemphillian).

Fossil content 
The following fossils have been found in the formation:

 Aetobatus arcuatus
 Calippus hondurensis
 Carcharhinus longimanus, C. priscus
 Dasyatis cavernosa
 Dinohippus mexicanus
 Gavialosuchus americana
 Hemipristis serra
 Isogomphodon acuarius, I. caunellensis
 Isurus desorii
 Pleiolama vera
 Pliometanastes cf. protistus
 Protohippus gidleyi
 Rhynchotherium blicki
 Scirrotherium antelucanus
 Sibotherium ka
 Sphyrna arambourgi
 Apalone sp.
 Arius sp.
 Eurhinodelphis sp.
 Goniodelphis sp.
 Hadrodelphis sp.
 Myliobatis sp.
 Orycterocetus sp.
 Rhinoptera sp.
 Sparus sp.
 Emydinae indet.
 Megatheriidae indet.
 Mylodontidae indet.
 Tayassuidae indet.

See also 
 List of fossiliferous stratigraphic units in Costa Rica

References

Bibliography

Further reading 
 C. Laurito, A. L. Valerio, E. Ovares, A. Hernández, and D. Pizarro. 2008. Peces Fósiles de la localidad Las Lomas de Siquirres cause del Río Reventazón, Formación Río Banano, Mioceno Superior, Provincia de Limón, Costa Rica [Fossil fishes of the Las Lomas de Siquirres Locality, Reventazon river, Rio Banano Formation, Late Miocene, Limon province, Costa Rica]. Revista Geológica de América Central 38:11-25
 C. A. Laurito and A. L. Valerio. 2008. The first record of Gavialosuchus americanus Sellards (1915)† (Eusuchia: Crocodylidae, Tomistominae) for the Late Tertiary of Costa Rica and Central America. Revista Geológica de América Central 39:107-115

Geologic formations of Costa Rica
Miocene Series of North America
Neogene Costa Rica
Hemphillian
Conglomerate formations
Deltaic deposits
Paleontology in Costa Rica
Formations
Formations